Radio Panorama 107.6 FM is a South African community radio station based in the Free State.

Coverage areas 
Welkom
Virginia
Kroonstad
Ventersburg
Allanridge
Odendaalsrus
Henneman
Touches Senekal, Theunissen, Bothaville, and Wesselsbron

Broadcast languages
Afrikaans
English

Broadcast time
00h01 – 00h00

Target audience
Whole community
LSM Groups 3 - 10
Age Group 16 – 50+

Programme format
40% Talk
60% Music

Listenership Figures

References

External links
 Live Audio Stream
 SAARF Website

Community radio stations in South Africa
Mass media in the Free State (province)